Hermann Oldenberg (31 October 1854 – 18 March 1920) was a German scholar of Indology, and Professor at Kiel (1898) and Göttingen (1908).

Work
Oldenberg was born in Hamburg. His 1881 study on Buddhism, entitled Buddha: Sein Leben, seine Lehre, seine Gemeinde, based on Pāli texts, popularized Buddhism and has remained continuously in print since its first publication. With T. W. Rhys Davids, he edited and translated into English three volumes of Theravada Vinaya texts, two volumes of the (Vedic) Grhyasutras and two volumes of Vedic hymns on his own account, in the monumental Sacred Books of the East series edited by Max Müller. With his Prolegomena (1888), Oldenberg laid the groundwork to the philological study of the Rigveda.

In 1919 he became a foreign member of the Royal Netherlands Academy of Arts and Sciences.

He died in Göttingen.

Selected publications
  Oldenberg, Hermann, Die Religion des Veda. Berlin 1894; Stuttgart 1917; Stuttgart 1927; Darmstadt 1977
  Oldenberg, Hermann, trans. Müller, Max, ed. Vedic Hymns, part 2: Hymns to Agni. The Sacred Books of the East, vol. 46,  Oxford, Clarendon Press 1897. Reprint: Low Price Publications 1996, .
  Oldenberg, Hermann, trans./ed. "The Dîpavaṃsa: An Ancient Buddhist Historical Record, London: Williams and Norgate 1879.
  Oldenberg, Hermann. Buddha: his life, his doctrine, his order, London, Williams 1882.
  Oldenberg, Hermann, trans., Max Müller, ed. Sacred Books of the East Vol. XXIX, "The Grihya-sûtras, rules of Vedic domestic ceremonies", part 1, Oxford, The Clarendon press 1886
  Oldenberg, Hermann, trans. Müller, Max, trans. Sacred Books of the East Vol. XXX, "The Grihya-sûtras, rules of Vedic domestic ceremonies", part 2, Oxford, The Clarendon press 1892
 Rhys Davids, T. W.; Oldenberg, Hermann, trans. (1881–85). Vinaya Texts,  Sacred Books of the East, volumes XIII, XVII & XX, Clarendon/Oxford. Reprint: Motilal Banarsidass, Delhi (Dover, New York) Vol. XIII, Mahavagga I-IV, Vol. XVII, Mahavagga V-X, Kullavagga I-III, Vol. XX, Kullavagga IV-XII

References

Further reading

External links

1854 births
1920 deaths
German Indologists
German scholars of Buddhism
German male non-fiction writers
Members of the Royal Netherlands Academy of Arts and Sciences
Writers from Hamburg
German Sanskrit scholars
Pali–English translators
Sanskrit–English translators